Paul Grüninger (27 October 1891 – 22 February 1972) was a Swiss police commander in St. Gallen. He was recognized as one of the Righteous Among the Nations by the Yad Vashem Holocaust memorial foundation in 1971. Following the Austrian Anschluss, Grüninger saved about 3,600 Jewish refugees by backdating their visas and falsifying other documents to indicate that they had entered Switzerland at a time when legal entry of refugees was still possible. He was dismissed from the police force, convicted of official misconduct, and fined 300 Swiss francs. He received no pension and died in poverty in 1972.

Biography

Early life 
Grüninger attended a teacher preparatory school from 1907 to 1911. He also played football semi-professionally. In 1913 he joined SC Brühl and was part of the squad that won the 1915 Swiss first division title. Following completion of the military service, in 1919 he joined the police corps of the canton of St. Gallen.

Police commander of the Canton of St. Gallen in 1938 
Grüninger was the police commander of the Canton of St. Gallen that borders with Germany and Austria. Following the annexation of Austria by the Third Reich, Switzerland had closed its border also to Jewish people arriving without proper entry permits, and in October 1938 negotiations between Switzerland and the Third Reich led to the stamping of the infamous "J" in passports issued to Jewish people. As the situation worsened and the number of refugees who tried to illegally enter Switzerland crossing the so-called green border to be secure from the Holocaust increased, the then 47-year-old Swiss official decided in summer 1938 not to send back the refugees to their country where violent antisemitism was the official state policy, facing the consequences of breaching the explicit instructions of his government and suffering the consequences. Moreover, in order to legalize the refugees' status, he falsified the refugees' visas, so that their passports showed that they had arrived in Switzerland before March 1938, when immigration to Switzerland had been restricted. The manipulations of dates enabled the newly arrived Jewish refugees to be treated as legals, and they had to be taken to the Diepoldsau camp. There, aided by the Jewish organizations, the refugees awaited their permits for temporary stay in Switzerland or their departure to a final destination. Grüninger turned in false reports about the number of arrivals and the status of the refugees in his district, and impeded efforts to trace refugees who were known to have entered Switzerland illegally. He even paid with his own money to buy winter clothes for needy refugees. The German authorities informed the Swiss authorities of Grüninger's exploits, and he was dismissed from the police force in March 1939.

So-called Grüninger case of 1938 
The Swiss Federal Government initiated an investigation, whereupon Grüninger was dismissed by the government without notice in March 1939. Grüninger's trial at the district court of St. Gallen opened in January 1939 and dragged over two years. In March 1941 the court found him guilty of breach of duty, official misconduct and forgery to a fine. His retirement benefits were forfeited, and he was cashiered, fined and had to pay the trial costs. The court recognized his altruistic motivations, but found that nevertheless, as a state employee, it was his duty to follow his instructions.

Late life 
Ostracized and forgotten, Grüninger lived for the rest of his life in difficult circumstances. Despite the difficulties, he never regretted his action on behalf of the Jews. In 1954 he explained his motives: "It was basically a question of saving human lives threatened with death. How could I then seriously consider bureaucratic schemes and calculations". In December 1970 as a result of protest in the media, the Swiss government sent Grüninger "a somewhat reserved letter of apology, but refrained from reopening his case and reinstating his pension". Ostracized and accused and slandered as a womanizer and corrupt fraudster, even as a Nazi by some people in the 2000s, the former chief of police for the rest of his life was no longer fixed point: Grüninger died in 1972, nearly forgotten in Switzerland, without rehabilitation by the Swiss authorities.

Rehabilitation and Righteous Among the Nations 

After his death, Grüninger's fate was brought back partially into the public memory by some publications beginning in 1984, and steps to rehabilitate him were set into motion. The first attempt was rejected by the Swiss Council, and only as late as 1995, the Swiss federal Government finally annulled Grüninger's conviction: the district court of St. Gallen revoked the judgment against him and cleared him of all charges. Three years later the government of the Canton of St. Gallen paid compensation to his descendants, and in 1999 also the so-called Bergier Commission's report took part in Grüninger's rehabilitation, as well to rehabilitate the surviving people who had been convicted during the National Socialist period in Switzerland for their assistance to refugees – 137 women and men received public rehabilitation up to 2009.

In 1971, the Yad Vashem Holocaust memorial foundation in Israel honoured Grüninger as one of the Righteous Among the Nations. A street located in the northern Jerusalem neighbourhood of Pisgat Ze'ev has been named after him.

Honour in Switzerland 

 The stadium of the association football club Brühl St. Gallen is named in his honour.
 The Rhine bridge between Diepoldsau (Switzerland) and Hohenems in Austria, which was one of the locations in the film Akte Grüninger, was in summer 2012 named after Paul Grüninger.
 Paul Grüninger-Weg in Zürich-Oerlikon

Paul Grüninger in literature, film and television 
 Irma C. Erman: A Dream Drama with Justitia, a 1976 unpublished play in English.
 Grüningers Fall, a 1997 Swiss documentary film based on Stefan Keller's book Grüningers Fall. Geschichten von Flucht und Hilfe.
 Akte Grüninger, a 2013 Swiss-Austrian film

Literature 
 Stefan Keller: Grüningers Fall. Geschichten von Flucht und Hilfe. Rotpunktverlag, Zürich 1998, .
 Wulff Bickenbach: Gerechtigkeit für Paul Grüninger. Verurteilung und Rehabilitierung eines Schweizer Fluchthelfers (1938–1998). Böhlau, Köln 2009, .
 Tremain, Rose (2016) The Gustav Sonata. One of the characters is based on Grueninger.

References

External links

 Webpage of the Paul Grüninger foundation
 Yad Vashem The Holocaust Martyrs' and Heroes' Remembrance Authority: Paul Grüninger
 The Example of Grüninger
 Author Eyal Press discusses Paul Grüninger's heroism on Conversations from Penn State

Swiss Righteous Among the Nations
Swiss police officers
Swiss Protestants
1891 births
1972 deaths
Swiss men's footballers
People from St. Gallen (city)
Association footballers not categorized by position
Sportspeople from the canton of St. Gallen